Earthstar may refer to:
Geastrales or earthstar fungi, an order of mushrooms
Earthstar (band), a 1970s and 1980s American band

See also
 Earth Star (disambiguation)